Carstairs House, also known as Monteith House, is a country house  south-west  of Carstairs South Lanarkshire, Scotland. The house is protected as a category A listed building.

History
Carstairs House was designed by the Edinburgh architect William Burn and built for Henry Monteith MP between 1821 and 1823. It then passed to his son Robert Monteith, and on his death to Joseph Monteith, who built a hydroelectric plant at nearby Jarviswood, and the Carstairs House Tramway to transport guests and family to and from Carstairs railway station. It was purchased by Sir James King, the former Lord Provost of Glasgow in 1899.

In 1924 Carstairs House was acquired the Roman Catholic Archdiocese of Glasgow who had selected it as base for the St Charles' Certified Institution for "mentally defective Catholic children". The children arrived there in 1925. The institution, which was staffed by Daughters of Charity of Saint Vincent de Paul, closed in 1983.

The house re-opened as a nursing home known as Monteith House (named after its original owner) in 1986 and, after a temporary closure between 2009 and 2011, re-opened again.

References

Category A listed buildings in South Lanarkshire
Country houses in South Lanarkshire
Houses completed in 1823
Nursing homes in the United Kingdom
Former psychiatric hospitals in Scotland
Defunct hospitals in Scotland
Carstairs